Constant voltage may refer to:
 Constant voltage speaker system, a distributed speaker system
 Voltage source, electrical power source that regulate voltage to a constant level